The LeGarde Twins were a pair of identical twins, Tom and Ted (b. 15 March 1931, in Mackay. Ted LeGarde passed away Aug 1, 2018. Tom LeGarde passed away July 30, 2021 Queensland), from Australia who played country music.

Career
The twins left home at the age of 15 and after trying their luck on the rodeo circuit as cowboys, they began playing music (they both sing and play guitar) and performed throughout Australia (with the nickname "Australia's Yodeling Stockmen"). They were signed to the Rodeo label from 1950 to 1952, after which they released a string of hits in the 1950s on Regal Zonophone Records. In 1957, they left for North America, initially for Canada (they had acknowledged Canadian country singer Wilf Carter, or "Montana Slim", as an influence); they were even rumored to get their own TV show on the Canadian channel CTV. Soon, however, they left for Hollywood, performed on Doye O'Dell's Western Varieties TV shows, and hosted a TV show on KTLA in Los Angeles, before settling down in Nashville. In the 1970s they were touring the United States, part of a revival of interest in the music of the old western movies. In 1972, they signed with American Heritage Records, and in 1980 with the Australian label Festival Records.

In later years, they opened up the LeGarde Twins Country Music Theatre in Twitty City, in Hendersonville, Tennessee; after the death of Conway Twitty, they moved the theatre to the Quality Inn Hall of Fame Hotel in Nashville. They were still active in the first decade of the 21st century, playing in the Nashville Palace in 2007, at the Williamsburg Film Festival in 2008, and at a festival in Franklin, North Carolina in 2008; in 2009 they played with Tommy Cash in Corydon, Indiana.

Movies, TV appearances
Both Ted and Tom were regulars on the 1963 TV show Network. They also both appeared on the Star Trek: The Original Series episode "I, Mudd" (1967). In 2009, Ted played the "Old Man Dalton" character in the movie D4, an action-thriller directed by Darrin Dickerson. On 10 February 1958, the Le Garde Twins appeared on the radio and television program "You Bet Your Life" with Groucho Marx. They said the secret word "People" and won $100. They won a further $100 on a consolation question after failing get four questions correct in the quiz. This appearance was later released on an album of original radio broadcasts.

Discography

Singles
"I Can Almost Touch The Feeling" became their top hit on the Billboard Top 100 Charts (Four Star Records)(1979)"In The Jail House Now" / "As Long As I Live" (Regal Zonophone 10" 78rpm G25401 - date ??)
"Daddy's Makin' Records in Nashville / Grady Family Band" (Invitation 101, 19??)
"Roll, Rock 'n' Roll That Hula Hoop / HiDi (instrumental)", with Earl Palmer & The Hoopers (Belcanto 45-BC-725, October 1958)
"Baby Sitter / Where Can The Lovelight Be" (Liberty F-55266, November 1960)
"A Donut and A Dream / Striped Circles" (American Heritage Music Corporation AH-401-39, April 1972)

Albums
Brand New
Songs of the West
Ballads of the Bushlands
One Little Letter
Down Under Country (1981, Festival)

References

External links
Legarde Twins website
 (Ted)
 (Tom)

1930 births
Australian country music groups
Australian folk music groups
Queensland musical groups
Living people
Musical groups established in 1950